Niemelä is a Finnish surname. Notable people with the surname include:

 Aarne Ilmari Niemelä (1907–1975), Finnish chess player
 Esu Niemelä (1921–1999), Finnish farmer and politician
 Artturi Niemelä (born 1923), Finnish homesteader and politician
 Virpi Niemelä (1936–2006), Finnish Argentine astronomer
 Pekka Niemelä (born 1974), Finnish ski jumping coach and former ski jumping
 Markus Niemelä (born 1984), Finnish race car driver
 Mikko Niemelä (born 1990), Finnish ice hockey defenceman
 Joonas Niemelä (born 1997), Finnish ice hockey forward

Finnish-language surnames